The Romans in their Decadence is a painting by the French artist Thomas Couture, first exhibited at the Paris Salon of 1847, a year before the 1848 Revolution which toppled the July Monarchy. It was the most highly praised work at the Salon. Reminiscent of the style of Raphael, it is typical of the French 'classic' style between 1850 and 1900. It now belongs to the Musée d'Orsay in Paris. It was etched by Edmond Hédouin (1820–1889).

It is the cover of the book "From Dawn to Decadence" of the French-American writer and teacher Jacques Barzun.

See also
Roman decadence

References

1847 paintings
Paintings in the collection of the Musée d'Orsay
Ancient Rome in art and culture
Prostitution in paintings